Manoj Kumar Agrawal is an Indian politician and a member of the Indian National Congress party.

Career

Political career
He became an MLA in 2013.

Political Views
He supports Congress Party's Ideology.

Personal life
He is married to Archana Agrawal.

References

See also

Madhya Pradesh Legislative Assembly
2013 Madhya Pradesh Legislative Assembly election
2008 Madhya Pradesh Legislative Assembly election

1963 births
Living people
Indian National Congress politicians from Madhya Pradesh